Mukandpur is a village near Banga, Nawanshahr district (also known as Shahid Bhagat Singh Nagar) in Punjab, India.

Demographics
According to the 2001 Census, Mukandpur has a population of 3,785. Neighbouring villages include Jagatpur, Prozepur, Talwandi Phattu, Jhingran, Gunachaur, Shokar and Raipur Dabba, Hakimpur.

Shopping
The village has expanded to include a shopping area near bus stand which serves the local villages.

Education

Schools
There are 5 schools including Shri Guru Har Rai Public School and  DAV school which has affiliation with the CBSE board.

Amardeep Singh Shergill Memorial College Mukandpur

Popular Punjabi singer Geeta Zaildar obtained his formal music education from Ustad Janab Shamshad Ali, a Music Professor of Amardeep Shergill Memorial College Mukandpur.

Amardeep Mela
The "Amardeep Mela" is organised annually by the Amardeep Singh Shergill Memorial College, Mukandpur. An annual feature of the College since its inception, the Mela lasts for four days.

Mela Jagatpur Baba Ram Chand Ji (CHAUNKIAN DA MELA)
A famous fair also known as "Chaunkian da Mela" is held in Mukandpur and Jagatpur.A faqir named Sakhi Sarwar (Lakh Data) came to Balachaur. He started his journey from Rattewal and reached Jagatpur (a neighbour village) on his horse at Jagatpur darbar. Since then this fair is held in Mukandpur and Jagatpur lasts for nine days. A "Saang" starts from Rattewal and reaches Jagatpur . The leader of the "Saang" holds a flag which is called a "Togh".

See also
Mukandpur village (now named as Chak No.65-GB in Tehsil Jaranwala, District Faisalabad, Pakistan)

References

Nawanshahr
Villages in Shaheed Bhagat Singh Nagar district